Pseudaletis clymenus, the common fantasy, is a butterfly in the family Lycaenidae. The species was first described by Hamilton Herbert Druce in 1885. It is found in western and eastern Nigeria, Cameroon, the Central African Republic and the Democratic Republic of the Congo. The habitat consists of forests.

References

External links
Die Gross-Schmetterlinge der Erde 13: Die Afrikanischen Tagfalter. Plate XIII 66 h

Butterflies described in 1885
Pseudaletis
Butterflies of Africa
Taxa named by Hamilton Herbert Druce